The Srawasthi Mandiraya is the primary office complex of the Western Provincial Council, located in Cinnamon Gardens, a suburb of Colombo. Built in 1913, it saw use for most of its lifetime as a hostel for Members of Parliament from outside Colombo who were attending Parliamentary sittings. It is located along Sir Marcus Fernando Mawatha (formerly Edinburgh Crescent).

History
The mansion was built in 1913 along the lines of a Tuscan villa by veterinary surgeon and philanthropist W. A. de Silva, member of the Legislative Council of Ceylon and the State Council of Ceylon, and who served as Minister of Health (1936 - 1942). One of the largest houses in Colombo at the time, Dr de Silva hosted many dignitaries such as Jawaharlal Nehru, Rabindranath Tagore and Lord Donoughmore. He later gifted the mansion to the nation.

With Ceylon gaining independence, the house was converted by the Government of Ceylon as a hostel for Member of Parliament who had to travel to Colombo from their constituencies to attend Parliamentary sittings. Following the construction of the Madiwela Housing Complex (consisting of 120 housing units for Members of Parliament), the functions of Srawasthi as a hostel ceased. It was then taken over by the Western Provincial Council as its office complex.

References

External links
 Western Province Provincial Council
 Parliament of Sri Lanka

Former official residences in Sri Lanka
Government buildings in Colombo
Houses completed in 1913
Houses in Colombo
Manor houses in Sri Lanka